Creswell Township is a township in Cowley County, Kansas, USA.  As of the 2000 census, its population was 2,098.

Geography
According to the USGS, it contains one cemetery, Parker.

The streams of Spring Creek and Walnut River run through this township.

Transportation
Creswell Township contains two airports or landing strips: Charden Farms Airport and Marrs Field.

References
 USGS Geographic Names Information System (GNIS)

External links
 City-Data.com
 Kansas Department of Transportation

Townships in Cowley County, Kansas
Townships in Kansas